Jabir Madari Pilliyalil (born 8 June 1996), better known as M. P. Jabir, is an Indian athlete who specializes in 400 metres hurdles and 400 metres.

Jabir won the bronze medal at the 2017 Asian Athletics Championships in 400 metres hurdles with a timing of 50.22 seconds. At the same event in 2019 Asian Athletics Championships in Doha, he set his personal best timing of 49.13 to win bronze and achieved the qualification standard for 2019 World Athletics Championships.

Jabir became the first Indian male athlete to qualify for the 400m hurdles in Olympics, after earning qualification for the event in the 2020 Summer Olympics.

Jabir works for the Indian Navy and is posted at Kochi, as of 2017.

References

External links
 

1996 births
Living people
Indian male hurdlers
Indian male sprinters
Athletes from Kerala
Indian Navy personnel
Athletes (track and field) at the 2020 Summer Olympics
Olympic athletes of India